Sally Champlin is an American character actress of film and television and singer/recording artist. Champlin attended Tamalpais High School, in Mill Valley, California. After joining choir, she began professional voice training and performed in several productions before graduating in 1962. After high school, she attended San Francisco State College.

Champlin is known for appearing in such films as Die Watching, An Element of Truth, and In the Light of the Moon. She also had a minor recurring role on the series Heroes as Lynette, featuring most prominently in the episodes Shadowboxing and Once Upon a Time In Texas. Other television shows she has appeared in include Dallas, Murphy Brown (in 3 episodes as Maureen), Frasier and Mike & Molly. She appeared in 10 episodes of The Young and the Restless as Judge Pat Stewart. Champlin also portrayed the President of the United States in Perfect Lover. She also appears in the 2000 film Ed Gein, as the quick-witted, ("dirty-talker") barmaid, and one of Ed's unfortunate victims, Mary Hogan.

References

External links
 
 Official Website

American television actresses
People from Mill Valley, California
Tamalpais High School alumni
Living people
Year of birth missing (living people)
21st-century American women